Adam Dalgliesh (pronounced "dal-gleash") is a fictional character who is the protagonist of fourteen mystery novels by P. D. James; the first being James's 1962 novel Cover Her Face. He also appears in the two novels featuring James's other detective, Cordelia Gray.

Character
In the first novel, Dalgliesh is a Detective Chief Inspector. He eventually reaches the rank of Commander in the Metropolitan Police at New Scotland Yard, London. He is an intensely cerebral and private person. He writes poetry, a fact about which his colleagues are fond of reminding him. Several volumes of his poetry have been published. Dalgliesh lives in a flat above the Thames at Queenhithe in the City of London. In the earlier novels he drives a Cooper Bristol, later a Jaguar. He was described as being "tall, dark and handsome" by some women, alluding to Mr. Darcy from Jane Austen's Pride and Prejudice.

His father was the rector of a Norfolk country parish. His sole family relation was his aunt, Jane Dalgliesh, whom he held in high esteem. After her death, Dalgliesh inherits, among other bequests, a converted windmill located on the Norfolk coast.  In his lengthy career, he has been quite astute and successful and now heads a squad of CID officers working on only the most sensitive cases.

Dalgliesh is a widower. He lost his wife in childbirth 13 years before A Mind to Murder, and was reluctant to commit himself ever since. His relationship with Deborah Riscoe ended because of this. During his time at St. Anselm's in Suffolk, he meets Cambridge lecturer Emma Lavenham and later asks her to marry him. The wedding takes place at the end of The Private Patient, published in 2008.

The character's name was chosen in honour of the author's English teacher at Cambridge High School. Years later, she learnt that Miss Dalgliesh's father had in fact been named Adam.

Bibliography

Novels

Short stories
 "The Boxdale Inheritance"
 "The 12 Clues of Christmas"

Related novels
Cordelia Gray mysteries:

 An Unsuitable Job for a Woman (1972)
 The Skull Beneath the Skin (1982)

Recurring characters

Partners
Detective Sergeant Martin is Dalgliesh's partner in Cover Her Face and A Mind to Murder. (Martin is played in the ITV adaptation by Robert Pugh.) In Shroud for a Nightingale he partners with Detective Sergeant Masterson (portrayed by Jeremy Irvine for the Channel 5 series). Dalgliesh's first permanent partner was the moody and arrogant Detective Chief Inspector Massingham (played by John Vine). Detective Inspector Kate Miskin (played for ITV by Penny Downie, Lizzy McInnery and Sarah Winman, for the BBC by Tilly Blackwood and for Channel 5 by Carlyss Peer) serves with Dalgliesh and Massingham in Scotland Yard's Special Investigation Squad. In The Lighthouse, Miskin takes over running the investigation when Dalgliesh contracts SARS. She is still a member of Dalgliesh's team in The Private Patient (2008).

DI Daniel Aaron (Tim Dutton) replaces Massingham when Massingham leaves Dalgliesh's squad. Aaron is presumably suspended after the events of Original Sin; DI Piers Tarrant (William Beck) is his replacement. When Tarrant is then transferred to Special Branch, DS Francis Benton-Smith replaces him. (Miskin has a short romantic relationship with Piers Tarrant after he leaves the Squad.) Benton-Smith, the ambitious and good-looking son of English and Indian parents, is at first resented by Kate Miskin, but they develop a good working relationship.

Relatives, friends, and romances
Jane Dalgliesh is Adam Dalgiesh's aunt and his sole living relative until her death prior to Devices and Desires. Introduced in Unnatural Causes, she is described as a very private and cerebral person, not unlike Dalgliesh himself. She is fond of bird watching and possesses a cottage in Suffolk which she later sells and buys a converted windmill in Norfolk, which Dalgliesh inherits upon her death.

Conrad Ackroyd is one of Dalgliesh's personal friends. He is a member of the Cadaver Club, a private club of crime enthusiasts featured in Unnatural Causes as well as other novels. He is editor and publisher of The Paternoster Review. Ackroyd's connections in the London establishment are often an asset to Dalgliesh.

Deborah Riscoe (played by Mel Martin) is one of Dalgliesh's romantic interests; they first meet when a murder shakes Riscoe's home in Cover Her Face; their relationship develops over the course of A Mind to Murder. However, because of Dalgliesh's reluctance to commit, Riscoe ends their relationship via a letter at the conclusion of Unnatural Causes, accepting a transfer to the United States of America.

Emma Lavenham (played by Janie Dee) is a lecturer in literature at Cambridge University. She and Dalgleish meet in Death in Holy Orders, develop a relationship during The Murder Room, and, following Dalgliesh's convalescence from SARS on Combe Island (in The Lighthouse), decide to marry, which they do at the end of The Private Patient.

Dalgliesh makes several small appearances in the two novels in the Cordelia Gray series, An Unsuitable Job for a Woman and The Skull Beneath the Skin. Cordelia Gray is a private detective and runs a detective agency in Kingsly Street. Dalgliesh is asked to look into the death of Sir Ronald Callender in Cambridge and acquits Gray of any charges. Gray and Dalgliesh stayed in contact, as evidenced by the congratulations card Dalgliesh receives from Gray while convalescing after a successful operation at the beginning of The Black Tower. Gossiping Conrad Ackroyd also remarks on Dalgliesh's being seen dining out with Cordelia in A Taste for Death.

Adaptations

Television
All of James's novels featuring Adam Dalgliesh up to and including The Murder Room have been adapted for television, beginning with Death of an Expert Witness in 1983.  The first ten novels (in the order shown below) were adapted by Anglia Television for transmission on the ITV network and starred Roy Marsden as Dalgliesh. The BBC took over the series in 2003, and Martin Shaw played the role in Death in Holy Orders and The Murder Room. The television adaptations have not always been faithful to the novel they dramatise, partly because they are out of chronological order.

Death of an Expert Witness: Dalgliesh leads the hunt for an elusive strangler in The Fens.
Shroud for a Nightingale: Dalgliesh becomes entangled in a deadly murder hunt inside a training home for nurses.
Cover Her Face: Dalgliesh follows a young girl and a trail of death to a beautiful country home.
The Black Tower: Mysterious deaths at a rest home and a reckless move in the drugs trade turn into a dice with death for Dalgliesh.
A Taste for Death: Dalgliesh sets up the Sensitive Crimes Squad and faces an immediate challenge.
Devices and Desires: Holidaying in Norfolk, Dalgliesh is caught up in a series of murders when he discovers a body.
Unnatural Causes: Dalgliesh is drawn into a macabre murder case during his investigations into a currency scam.
A Mind to Murder: Dalgliesh is called in following the grotesque murder of a middle-aged woman.
Original Sin: Dalgliesh discovers a body whilst investigating a series of alarming hate mail attacks on a poet.
A Certain Justice: Dalgliesh becomes involved in the death of criminal barrister Venetia Aldridge.
Death in Holy Orders: Dalgliesh investigates an apparent suicide at Saint Anselm's seminary, which is run by an old friend, Father Martin Petrie; the coincidence of another death leads to a murder investigation; Dalgliesh meets Emma Lavenham and they subsequently begin a relationship.
The Murder Room: At the beginning Dalgliesh investigates the murder in the grounds of the Dupayne Museum, of Neville Dupayne; at the end of a mad dash to the railway station, he proposes to Emma Lavenham.

A series Dalgliesh starring Bertie Carvel premiered on Acorn TV and Channel 5 in November 2021. It follows Dalgliesh from the 1970s to the present with Shroud for a Nightingale, The Black Tower and A Taste for Death incorporated into the first season.

BBC Radio
Five of the Dalgliesh novels have been dramatised by Neville Teller for BBC Radio 4. Robin Ellis played Dalgliesh in Cover Her Face (1993; miscredited as Robert Ellis by the BBC announcer) and Devices and Desires (1998).  Phillip Franks played the role in A Certain Justice (2005).  Dalgliesh was then played by Richard Derrington in A Taste for Death (2008) and The Private Patient (2010).

References

Further reading
 Hubly, Erlene. "Adam Dalgliesh: Byronic Hero." Clues: A Journal of Detection 3: 40-46.
 Kotker, Joan G. "PD James's Adam Dalgliesh Series." in In the Beginning: First Novels in Mystery Series (1995): 139+
 Sharkey, Jo Ann. Theology in suspense: how the detective fiction of PD James provokes theological thought. (PhD  Dissertation, University of St Andrews, 2011). online

External links 
 Adam Dalgliesh on BBC
 
 

Fictional British police detectives
Fictional gentleman detectives
Fictional poets
Characters in British novels of the 20th century
Literary characters introduced in 1962
British detective novels
Television shows produced by Anglia Television